Moisei Teif (Moisei Solomonovich Teif; , Moshe ben Shlomo Teif, also Moshe Taif) (September 4, 1904 – December 23, 1966) was a Yiddish Soviet poet born in Minsk, Belarus. He died in Moscow on December 23, 1966. He was  a member of the editorial board of one of the few Soviet Yiddish magazines "Sovetish Heymland" [Soviet Homeland].

Books (list to be updated):
 Teif, Moishe. Proletarke, shvester mayne: novele. Minsk: Melukhe-farlag, 1935.
 Teif, Moishe. Tsuzamen: kinder-zamlung. Minsk: Melukhe-farlag fun Vaysrusland, 1935.

External links
 http://vcisch1.narod.ru/TEIF/Teif.htm
 http://www.lechaim.ru/ARHIV/173/slovo.htm

Yiddish-language writers
Belarusian Jews
Jewish writers
1904 births
1966 deaths